John Maloney may refer to:

John David Maloney (born 1945), former Canadian Member of Parliament for Welland, current mayor of Port Colborne, Ontario
John William Maloney (1883–1954), Canadian Member of Parliament for Northumberland
John Maloney (U.S. politician) (died 1918), Alaskan lawyer, businessman and politician
John Maloney (baseball), Major League Baseball center fielder
John H. Maloney (1918–2001), Canadian politician and physician
John W. Maloney (1896–1978), American architect
Jon Maloney (born 1985), footballer
Johnny Maloney (1932-2004), British Olympic boxer

See also
John Moloney (disambiguation)